Ukō Washio  was a Japanese novelist. He is best known for his Akutagawa Prize-winning novel .

Biography 
Washio was born Hiroshi Washio on April 27, 1892 in Niigata prefecture, Japan. He graduated from Waseda University in 1915. He enjoyed Western literature, and published a translation of Gabriele D'Annunzio's Francesca da Rimini while he was attending university. After university he worked in publishing. In 1935 he won the Naoki Prize for his novel . Washio died on February 9, 1951.

Selected works

References 

1892 births
1951 deaths
People from Niigata Prefecture
20th-century Japanese novelists
Naoki Prize winners